Bani Hushaysh District is a district in Sana'a Governorate, Yemen. , the district had a population of 73,957 inhabitants. It's also famous for grape plantations.

References

Districts of Sanaa Governorate
Bani Hushaysh District